Home energy storage devices store electricity locally, for later consumption. Electrochemical energy storage products, also known as "Battery Energy Storage System" (or "BESS" for short), at their heart are rechargeable batteries, typically based on lithium-ion or lead-acid controlled by computer with intelligent software to handle charging and discharging cycles. Companies are also developing smaller flow battery technology for home use. As a local energy storage technologies for home use, they are smaller relatives of battery-based grid energy storage and support the concept of distributed generation. When paired with on-site generation, they can virtually eliminate blackouts in an off-the-grid lifestyle.

Operating modes

On-site generation
The stored energy commonly originates from on-site solar photovoltaic panels, generated during daylight hours, and the stored electricity consumed after sundown, when domestic energy demand peaks in homes unoccupied during the day. Small wind turbines are less common but still available for home use as a complement or alternative to solar panels.

Electric vehicles used during weekdays, needing recharging overnight, are a good fit with home energy storage in homes with solar panels and low daylight-hour electrical consumption. Electric vehicle manufacturers BMW, BYD, Nissan and Tesla market own-brand home energy storage devices to their customers. By 2019, such devices had not followed the price reduction of automotive batteries.

The units can also be programmed to exploit a differential tariff, that provide lower priced energy during hours of low demand - seven hours from 12:30am in the case of Britain’s Economy 7 tariff - for consumption when prices are higher.

Smart tariffs, stemming from the increasing prevalence of smart meters, will increasingly be paired with home energy storage devices to exploit low off-peak prices, and avoid higher-priced energy at times of peak demand.

Advantages

Overcoming grid losses
Transmission of electrical power from power stations to population centres is inherently inefficient, due to transmission losses in electrical grids, particularly within power-hungry dense conurbations where power stations are harder to site. By allowing a greater proportion of on-site generated electricity to be consumed on-site, rather than exported to the energy grid, home energy storage devices can reduce the inefficiencies of grid transport.

Energy grid support
Home energy storage devices, when connected to a server via the internet, can theoretically be ordered to provide very short-term services to the energy grid:-
 Reduced peak hour demand stress - provision of short-term demand response during periods of peak demand reducing the need to inefficiently stand up short generation assets like diesel generators.
 Frequency correction - the provision of ultra short-term corrections, to keep mains frequency within the tolerances required by regulators (e.g., 50 Hz or 60 Hz +/- n%).

Reduced reliance on fossil fuels
Due to the above efficiencies, and their ability to boost the amount of solar energy consumed on-site, the devices reduce the amount of power generated using fossil fuels, namely natural gas, coal, oil and diesel.

Disadvantages

Environmental impact of batteries
Lithium-ion batteries, a popular choice due to their relatively high charge cycle and lack of memory effect, are difficult to recycle.

Lead-acid batteries are relatively easier to recycle and, due to the high resale value of the lead, 99% of those sold in the US get recycled. They have much shorter useful lives than a lithium-ion battery of a similar capacity, due to having a lower charge cycle, narrowing the environmental-impact gap. In addition, lead is a toxic heavy metal and the sulfuric acid in the electrolyte has a high environmental impact.

Second life for electric vehicle batteries

To offset the environmental impact of batteries, some manufacturers extend the useful life of used batteries taken from electric vehicles at the point where the cells won't sufficiently hold charge. Though considered end of life for electric vehicles, the batteries will function satisfactorily in home energy storage devices. Manufacturers supporting this include Nissan, BMW and Powervault.

Salt water batteries
Home Energy Storage devices can be paired with salt water batteries, which have a lower environmental impact due to their lack of toxic heavy metal and ease of recyclability.

Saltwater batteries are no longer being produced on a commercial level after the bankruptcy of Aquion Energy in March 2017.

Alternatives or complement

Using a pumped-storage system of cisterns for energy storage and small generators, pico hydro generation may also be effective for "closed loop" home energy generation systems.

A storage heater or heat bank (Australia) is an electrical heater which stores thermal energy during the evening, or at night when electricity is available at lower cost, and releases the heat during the day as required.

Accumulators, like a Hot water storage tank, are another type of storage heater but specifically store hot water for later use.

See also
 Energy storage
 Rechargeable battery
 UltraBattery
 Flow battery
 Criticism of vehicle-to-grid
 Distributed generation
 Other forms of grid-energy storage
 Smart grid
 Energy as a service
 Uninterruptible power supply

References

Energy storage